Meow is a 2021 Indian Malayalam-language family drama film directed by Lal Jose and starring Soubin Shahir and Mamta Mohandas.

The film is about a non-resident Indian businessman named Dasthakir who lives in the United Arab Emirates. He is from Aluva and hates cats. The film was shot in Ras Al Khaimah, United Arab Emirates.

Cast 
Soubin Shahir as Dasthakir "Dasthu"
Mamta Mohandas as Sulekha (Sulu)
Salim Kumar as Ustad
Harisree Yousuf as Chandran 
Cat as Diana

Soundtrack
Music by Justin Varghese.
‘Hijabi’ - Adheef Muhamed (lyrics by Suhail Koya)

Reception
A critic from Sify wrote that "Meow is narrated in a conventional way and if you are fine about that style, this one could be a fine watch". The Times of India wrote that "Both the script and the direction needed to be tighter to keep the audience interested, particularly when viewers are spoilt for choice on OTT platforms". A critic from The News Minute wrote that Meow "is just a random sequence of events in somebody’s life that you get to watch, but you don’t really get the point of it". A critic from The Hindu wrote that "Meow is one of those films that does not hit any highs or lows, and proceeds along at a largely uneventful, even pace". Contrary to the negative reviews, a critic from Manorama Online praised the film and said that "In short, Meow is the perfect family entertainer for this Christmas".

References

2020s Malayalam-language films
2021 drama films
Indian drama films
Indian family films
Films shot in the United Arab Emirates
Films shot in Abu Dhabi
2021 films
Films directed by Lal Jose